Jiří Vaněk was the defending champion, but Ivan Dodig defeated him in the quarterfinals.
The new champion became other Czech player, Jan Hájek who won against Dodig in the final (7–5, 6–1).

Seeds

Draw

Final four

Top half

Bottom half

References
 Main Draw
 Qualifying Draw

Prosperita Open - Singles
2009 Singles